Syrian Mexicans are Mexican of Syrian origin. According to the 2000 census, there were 246 Syrians living in Mexico. In 1890, there were more than 1,000 Syrians residing in the country, but the vast majority emigrated to the United States because of the Syrian civil war.

History 
In the early 20th century, several thousand Syrians emigrated from the Ottoman Empire to Mexico. Many of the Syrian emigrants were of Jewish origin primarily from Aleppo and Damascus. Thousands of Syrian Jews lived in the area from the 1920s to the 1950s, creating a similar counterpart of their Middle Eastern homeland within its streets and plazas. Mexico City's Syrian Jewelry is unique in that it was divided in the 1930s into two separate communities, those who were initially from Aleppo (the “Maguen David” community) and those who originated from Damascus. Several prominent Mexican intellectuals, politicians and businesspeople are of Syrian origin. Most Syrian immigrants settled in Mexico City, Monterrey, Guadalajara, Toluca, Tapachula, Cuernavaca and Chiapas.

In 2015, the Mexican government allowed a few Syrian refugees to come to Mexico and complete their university education, with the assistance of a local Mexican NGO. Mexico also donated US$3 million in support of Syrian refugees in Jordan, Lebanon and in Turkey.

Demographics

Notable Syrian Mexicans 
Ikram Antaki, writer
Arturo Elías Ayub, businessman
José Sulaimán, boxing official
Mauricio Sulaimán, businessman and sports administrator

See also 
Arab Mexican
Lebanese Mexicans
Mexico–Syria relations

References 

 
Ethnic groups in Mexico
Mexico
 
Immigration to Mexico